Ellen Thompson may refer to:
 Ellen Powell Thompson, American naturalist and botanist
 Ellen R. Thompson, American composer and music educator
 Elaine Thompson-Herah, née Thompson, Jamaican sprinter

See also
 Ellen Mosley-Thompson, glaciologist and climatologist